Martin James Boon (1840-1888) was a radical trade unionist. In 1869 he participated in the establishment of the Land and Labour League of which he was a secretary until it ceased operation in 1873. Despite having penned a pamphlet opposing emigration, he emigrated to South Africa, and wrote a further pamphlet on railway nationalisation as well as idiosyncratic histories of the Orange Free State and South Africa. The latter contained considerable fragments of a personal memoir and includes the only contemporary history of the Land and Labour League.

Attended the General Council of the First International in 1871.

References

External links
 

British trade unionists
1840 births
1888 deaths
19th-century British businesspeople